Kitts Green is an area of Birmingham, England, approximately 5 miles east of the city centre and on the borders of Tile Cross, Lea Village, Lea Hall, and Garretts Green. Historically in Warwickshire, Kitts Green dates back to when it was first mentioned in 1495 whereas Lea Village is first documented in 1275.

Kitts Green is served by services 14 (Birmingham to Chelmsley Wood via Alum Rock), service A9 from Kingshurst and Ilshaw Heath and service 72 from Chelmsley Wood to Solihull and service 97 from Birmingham to Chelmsley Wood via Bordesley Green. Services 14, 72 and 97 are operated by National Express West Midlands. Service A9 is operated by Stagecoach Midlands. 

Roy Wood, co-founder of bands The Move, Electric Light Orchestra (ELO) and Wizzard, was born in Kitts Green in 1946.

Areas of Birmingham, West Midlands